The Grand Veneur de France or Grand Huntsman of France was a position in the King's Household in France during the Ancien Régime.  The word French "veneur" (huntsman), derives from the Middle French word "vener" (to hunt), (itself from the Latin venor, verb meaning to hunt), from which also was derived the archaic English words "venerer" (hunter) and "venery" (the hunt).  The position is sometimes grouped with the Great Officers of the Crown of France.  The position was one of the "Great Offices of the Maison du Roi".  The position was equivalent to that of the "Grand Master of the Hunt" in certain European royal households.

The Grand Veneur was responsible for the royal hunt.  The title was created in 1413 by Charles VI at roughly the same time as those of Grand Falconer of France and the "Capitaine du vautrait".  The Grand Veneur took care of the king's hunting dogs (roughly 100 hounds) for the stag hunt.  Under Charles VIII, he oversaw nine squires (écuyers), nine huntsmen (veneurs), two aides, six valets for the hounds (valets de limiers) and one dog handler for the foxhounds.  The service gained even greater prestige under Francis I and Henry II, and the position reached a high point under Henry IV; in 1596, 182 persons were employed by the royal hunt, which included lieutenants, sous-lieutenants, gentlemen, valets for the hounds, mounted and unmounted valets for the dogs, and finally a surgeon and an apothecary.

The Grand Veneur was the most important of all the royal offices dealing with the hunt.  In the 16th century, the house of Guise held the position five times.  In the 17th century, the family Rohan-Montbazon held it three times.  At the beginning of the 18th century, the position was given by Louis XIV to Louis-Alexandre de Bourbon, Comte de Toulouse, one of his legitimized children, who, in turn, passed it on to his son Louis Jean Marie de Bourbon, duc de Penthièvre.

From the 16th century, the holder of the position received an annual salary of 1200 livres, which was a relatively small sum within the royal household. The Grand Veneur also received additional revenues (up to 10,000 livres).  According to Saint-Simon, in 1714, the new Duke de La Rochefoucauld sold, for a sum of 500,000 livres. his office of Grand Veneur, which he had just inherited upon the death of his father.

Up to a point, the Grand Veneur de France position is comparable to the one of Master of the Buckhounds in the English monarchy.

See also

 Medieval hunting
 Great Officers of the Crown of France
 Maison du Roi
 Protokynegos
 Grand Huntsman of Brabant

References
This article is based on the article Grand veneur de France from the French Wikipedia, retrieved on September 7, 2006.

 
Court titles in the Ancien Régime
Hunting in France
History of hunting